The Casino is a 1972 Hong Kong drama Shaw Brothers Studio film directed by Cheung Chang Chak.

Overview 
Its alternative titles in Hong Kong are Jixiang dufang and Gat cheung do fong. It is a drama martial arts film with characters in a gambling environment.

Plot
A handsome strangle (Yueh Hua) visits the casino. A gambler agrees to help an old friend defeat a crooked gambler that uses rigged dice.

Cast 
 Lily Ho - Ms Cui 
 Yueh Hua - Luo Tianguang 
 Chin Feng - Master Lun Liu 
 Wu Ma - Xiao Wang

Release 
On March 30, 1972, the film was released in Hong Kong.

References

External links

1972 films
Hong Kong action drama films
1970s action films
1970s Mandarin-language films
Films about gambling
Shaw Brothers Studio films
1970s Hong Kong films